Kashmir white granite is a white base granite with brown and black mineral inclusions. These inclusions are called granules and are present in every piece of Kashmir white granite.

This natural stone is not a hundred percent granite technically, but in commercial use it is called granite.

Quarries of Kashmir white granite are located in India’s Tamil Nadu state.

Uses
Kashmir white granite is sometimes used for paving ground surfaces. It is also used as a countertop surface.

References

Further reading
 

Granite
Building stone
Mining in Tamil Nadu